Taras Foremsky (born February 15, 1980) is a Canadian ice hockey forward.

Junior and college
Foremsky began his hockey career in his local league, the Alberta Junior Hockey League (AJHL), where he spent three seasons plying his trade with four different teams putting up 212 points. The 2001-02 season was a bleak one for Foremsky only playing 10 games for Merrimack College of the NCAA. One year on and Foremsky had joined up with the Mount Royal College Cougars of the Alberta College's Athletic Hockey Conference (ACAC) posting 70 points in 28 games for the Cougars, leading the league in points, being picked for the first all-star team, receiving League MVP and setting a new league record for goals in a season.

Going pro
At the end of the successful 2002-03 season Foremsky was given a short-term contract with the Pensacola Ice Pilots of the ECHL grabbing 1+3 from 6 regular season games. The following years would hold uncertainty for Foremsky, who would represent 7 teams in 3 seasons, starting with Hassfurt in Germany before moving back to North America and the CHL with San Angelo and Fort Worth. The 2004/05 season would be more successful than those that it had proceeded, with Foremsky suiting up for the Torino Bulls of the Serie A, for whom he finished 2nd in goals, assists, points and penalty minutes for the team. The 2005/06 season would again be unsettled, with Foremsky playing in the UHL (Flint Generals), SPHL (Jacksonville Barracudas) and CHL (Memphis Riverkings).

Move to the U.K.
In 2006 Foremsky arrived in Peterborough to play for the Phantoms where he would set the league alight scoring 136 Pts. in 48 games, somehow finding time to rack up 102 penalty minutes. Foremsky also dominated the play-offs scoring 17 points in 7 games. His end of season plaudits included, top points scorer in EPL, top points scorer in League, Cup and Play-offs for Peterborough and selected for the EPL All-Star 1st Line 2006/07. It seemed as though the good times were going to keep on rolling for Taras and the Phantoms with Foremsky scoring 34 points in the first 14 games. But after a mid-game, dressing room dispute with head coach Phil David, Foremsky left through 'mutual consent'. Although it did not take long for Foremsky to attract interest from other clubs and was snapped up by eventual regular season champions Guildford Flames on November 10. Foremsky got off to a slow start at the Flames, finding it hard to gel with line mates, but once he found his mark he quickly established himself as a fan-favourite and was instrumental in the Flames regular season championship title. He scored 22+33 in 34 regular season games, being voted Supporters Club Player of the Year, an extrodinary achievement considering he missed over 2 months of the Flames season. Foremsky then re-signed for another year with Guildford in early May. After another slow start to the season Foremsky's production picked up as the months progressed but missed out on games due to the Flames carrying an extra import. Despite this Foremsky finished the season as the team's highest goal scorer on 33 goals. This was enough to earn him a second supporters club player of the year award from the fans. With major changes on the way in the summer the Flames were going to rebuild, where at this point led Foremsky to the decision to retire to run his family's butcher shop in Canada.

Playing record

Year by Year Record

Includes Play-Offs

Note: GP = Games played; G = Goals; A = Assists; Pts = Points; PIM = Penalty Minutes. All Stats from either Peterborough Phantoms' or Guildford Flames' websites

References

 https://www.flickr.com/search/?q=taras%20foremsky&w=all&s=int

External links
 Guildford Flames Profile
 Hockeydb.com Profile
 eurohockey.net Profile

1980 births
Living people
Guildford Flames players
Canadian ice hockey right wingers
Ice hockey people from Calgary
Canadian expatriate ice hockey players in England